Arno Sild (born 26 April 1947 in Rammuka, Võru County) is an Estonian politician. He has been member of XIII Riigikogu.

In 1971 he graduated from University of Tartu in law.

Since 1992 he has been a member of several agrarian or conservative parties, including Estonian Conservative People's Party.

References

Living people
1947 births
Conservative People's Party of Estonia politicians
Members of the Riigikogu, 2015–2019
University of Tartu alumni
People from Rõuge Parish